Trachyglanis is a genus of loach catfishes from Africa.

Species 
This genus currently includes four described species:
 Trachyglanis ineac (Poll, 1954)
 Trachyglanis intermedius Pellegrin, 1928
 Trachyglanis minutus Boulenger, 1902
 Trachyglanis sanghensis Pellegrin, 1925

References

Amphiliidae

Catfish genera
Freshwater fish genera
Taxa named by George Albert Boulenger